The year 641 BC was a year of the pre-Julian Roman calendar. In the Roman Empire, it was known as year 113 Ab urbe condita. The denomination 641 BC for this year has been used since the early medieval period, when the Anno Domini calendar era became the prevalent method in Europe for naming years.

Events
 Josiah becomes king of Judah.
 Tullus Hostilius dies, beginning the interregnum.

Births
 Zephaniah the prophet

Deaths
 Tullus Hostilius, third king of Rome
 Amon, king of Judah

References